Tipirneni is a surname. Notable people with the surname include:

Hiral Tipirneni (born 1967), Indian-born American politician and physician
Prashanti Tipirneni, Indian costume designer

Indian surnames